Samuel Bulkley Ruggles (April 11, 1799 – August 28, 1881) was an American lawyer and politician from New York. He was a member of the New York State Assembly in 1838, and a Canal Commissioner from 1839 to 1842 and in 1858. As a large landholder, he donated the land for the creation of Gramercy Park in New York City. Its restrictive covenant has preserved it through much development nearby.  He was a member of the city's Chamber of Commerce, which published his reports on economics and public policy. In the 1860s, he represented the United States at several international conferences on economics and statistics in Europe.

Early life
Samuel Ruggles was born in New Milford, Litchfield County, Connecticut of an old New England family.  He was the son of Ellen (née Bulkley) Ruggles and Philo Ruggles (1765–1829), who became Surrogate and District Attorney of Dutchess County, New York.  Chief Judge Charles H. Ruggles was his cousin.

Samuel was a precocious student and graduated from Yale College in 1814 at the age of 14. Although he read for the law, he had to wait to be admitted to the bar until he came of age in 1821.

Career
Ruggles became a successful lawyer in New York City for several years and accumulated large landholdings, but eventually gave up the practice of law for public affairs.

Political career
Ruggles was a Whig member from New York County of the New York State Assembly, sitting in the 61st New York State Legislature in 1838, and was Chairman of the Committee on Ways and Means.

In 1839, he was elected by the New York State Legislature as a Canal Commissioner to fill the vacancy caused by the death of Stephen Van Rensselaer. In 1840, he was the only canal commissioner to remain in office when the new Whig majority removed all Democratic commissioners. In 1842, the Whig commissioners, including Ruggles, were removed by the Democrats.

After leaving the Canal Commission, Ruggles became a member of the New York Chamber of Commerce. There he wrote numerous pamphlets and articles about public policy, economics and related issues, which were published by the Chamber.

He became a trustee of Columbia College. In 1854, concerned about its decline in enrollment and number of faculty in mid-century, and its trustees' decision against appointing a respected scientist, Dr. Oliver Wolcott Gibbs, because he was Unitarian, that year Ruggles self-published the 60-page pamphlet, "The Duty of Columbia College to the Community". It had started as a letter to the trustees but he decided to expand it and publish it. He urged appointment of Gibbs on the basis of his qualifications and also the upgrading of Columbia's curriculum to include more of the physical sciences, and made a plea for a strong college.  At the time, some people considered Gibbs' Unitarian orientation controversial. The university has long been secular.

In July 1858, Ruggles was appointed by Governor John Alsop King as a canal commissioner again, this time to fill the vacancy caused by the death of Samuel S. Whallon, and he served briefly until the end of the year.

In the 1860s, Ruggles was selected as a United States delegate and representative to several European assemblies, such as the International Statistics Congress in Berlin in 1863, the Paris Exposition of 1867, and the 1869 International Statistics Conference at The Hague.

Gramercy Park

As a large landholder in New York City, Ruggles created Gramercy Park, dedicated in 1831, to which he personally donated the land.  He deeded the property to the city with a covenant restricting surrounding uses to residential and providing that the residents be taxed to maintain the park.  He was also instrumental in getting Union Square established. Of the parks and squares he said,

Come what will, our open squares will remain forever imperishable. Buildings, towers, palaces, may moulder and crumble beneath the touch of time; but space—free, glorious, open space—will remain to bless the City forever.

Personal life
On May 15, 1822, Ruggles was married to Mary Rosalie Rathbone (1800–1878), the daughter of prominent merchant John Rathbone Sr.  Together, they were the parents of:
 Ellen Ruggles, who  married to the attorney George Templeton Strong (1820–1875) and lived in New York
 James Francis Ruggles (1827–1895) also lived in New York and who married Grace Baldwin (1857–1930). After his death, she married Henry Meyer Johnson.

Ruggles died on August 28, 1881 at the Surf Hotel on Fire Island where he spent his summer vacations. After his wife had died several years before, he had given up their big house and lived during the winter season at an apartment in the Westminster Hotel in New York City.

Descendants
Through his daughter Ellen, he was the grandfather of John Ruggles Strong and George Templeton Strong (1856–1948), a composer of classical music and a professional painter.

References

Bibliography
 Bender, Thomas, New York Intellect: A History of Intellectual Life in New York City, from 1750 to the Beginnings of Our Own Time, Knopf, 1987. 
"Gramercy Park", The New York Times, Editorial, 'July 3, 1921, p. 22. Gramercy Park's 90th anniversary and history.
"Samuel B. Ruggles, Founder Of Gramercy Park", Antiques Digest, reprinted. Originally published 1921.
The New York Civil List, compiled by Franklin Benjamin Hough, New York: Weed, Parsons and Co., 1858, pp. 42, 221 and 301
"An Old New-Yorker Gone; The Busy Life of Samuel B. Ruggles Brought to a Close", New York Times, 29 August 1881 (stating erroneously he had been a member of the Canal Board for 18 years)
"The Canal Commissionership", Copies of letters to and from Ruggles on his 1858 appointment, New York Times, 22 July 1858

External links

 
 
 "Samuel Bulkley Ruggles", Virtual American Biographies
 Samuel B. Ruggles, "The Duty of Columbia College to the Community", New York: J. F. Trow, 1854
 Samuel B. Ruggles Correspondence, 91–32. Special Collections, University Libraries, University of Nevada, Reno.
 

1799 births
1881 deaths
New York (state) lawyers
Yale College alumni
People from New Milford, Connecticut
Politicians from New York City
Erie Canal Commissioners
Members of the New York State Assembly
New York (state) Whigs
19th-century American politicians
Lawyers from New York City
19th-century American lawyers